The 2019 Formula 4 UAE Championship was the third season of the Formula 4 UAE Championship, a motor racing series for the United Arab Emirates regulated according to FIA Formula 4 regulations, and organised and promoted by the Automobile & Touring Club of the UAE (ATCUAE) and AUH Motorsports.

It began on 9 January 2019 at the Dubai Autodrome and finished on 2 March 2019 at the same location.

Teams and drivers

Race calendar

Championship standings

Points are awarded to the top 10 classified finishers in each race.

Drivers' Championship

Teams' championship
Ahead of each event, the teams nominate two drivers that accumulate teams' points.

Notes

References

External links
 F4 UAE Homepage

United Arab Emirates Formula 4 Championship
Formula 4 UAE Championship
Formula 4 UAE Championship seasons
UAE F4